WANO (1230 AM) is a radio station licensed to Pineville, Kentucky, and serving the greater Bell County community.  WANO broadcasts with a full-time signal of 1,000 Watts on 1230AM.

History
WANO signed on March 15, 1957, with the mission of serving the Pineville community with local news and information.

Ownership
South Bevins was the original licensee of WANO, and owned the station until approximately 1995, when the station was purchased by Warren Pursifull's Cumberland Media Group.  Warren had begun working at WANO as a teenager, leaving after his acquisition of Countrywide Broadcasters, Inc's WFXY/Middlesboro in November 1993.

In late 2005, both WANO and WFXY were acquired by Joshua Wilkey, a North Carolina businessman who moved to Bell County to run the stations.  Wilkey continues to own the stations, and WANO's studios are co-located with WFXY at 2118 Cumberland Avenue in Middlesboro. WANO's transmission facilities are located on Four Mile Road just outside the corporate limits of Pineville.

2007: Fire
Just after celebrating 50 years on the air, arsonists set fire to WANO's broadcasting facilities on the night of March 18, 2007. The result was a complete loss of the station's broadcasting equipment, leaving WANO off the air. Immediately, rebuilding efforts began, as the community rallied around the station. In record time, the station was back on the air, signing back on little more than a month later on April 20. The resulting rebuild made WANO state-of-the-art in every way, for the first time since 1957.

2009: New owner
In March 2009 Cumberland Omnimedia LLC. sold WANO to Penelope, Inc. Heading up the media division of the company will be Frank Smith, VP/GM of Penelope, Inc.
The FCC granted new ownership rights or assignment to Penelope, Inc. on October 22, 2009.

Programming
The station broadcasts a country music format, featuring hit music and classic country, as well as local newscasts and obituaries three times per day.

The station streams audio content 24/7 at www.1230wano.com

External links

Pineville, Kentucky
ANO
Radio stations established in 1957
Oldies radio stations in the United States